Janet Louise Yellen (born August 13, 1946) is an American economist serving as the 78th United States secretary of the treasury since January 26, 2021. She previously served as the 15th chair of the Federal Reserve from 2014 to 2018. She is the first person to hold those positions having also led the White House Council of Economic Advisers and the first woman to hold either post.

Born and raised in Bay Ridge, Brooklyn, Yellen graduated from Brown University in 1967 and earned a Ph.D. in economics from Yale University in 1971. She taught as an assistant professor at Harvard University from 1971 until 1976 when she began working for the Federal Reserve Board as a staff economist from 1977 to 1978 before joining the faculty of the London School of Economics from 1978 to 1980. Yellen is professor emeritus at the Haas School of Business and the University of California, Berkeley, where she has been a faculty member since 1980 and became the Eugene E. and Catherine M. Trefethen Professor of Business and Professor of Economics.

Yellen served as a member of the Federal Reserve Board of Governors from 1994 to 1997 and was nominated to the position by President Bill Clinton, who then named her chair of the Council of Economic Advisers from 1997 to 1999. She subsequently returned to academia before being appointed president and chief executive officer of the Federal Reserve Bank of San Francisco from 2004 until 2010. Afterward, President Barack Obama chose her to replace Donald Kohn as vice chair of the Federal Reserve from 2010 to 2014 before nominating her to succeed Ben Bernanke as chair of the Federal Reserve three years later. She had one of the shortest tenures in that position and was succeeded by Jerome Powell after President Donald Trump refused to renominate her for a second term. Following her resignation from the Federal Reserve, Yellen joined the Brookings Institution as a distinguished fellow in residence from 2018 until 2020, when she once again went into public service.

On November 30, 2020, then-President-elect Joe Biden nominated Yellen to serve as secretary of the treasury; she was confirmed by the U.S. Senate on January 25, 2021, and took office the next day.

Early life and education 
Yellen was born on August 13, 1946, to a family of Polish Jewish ancestry in the Bay Ridge, Brooklyn neighborhood of New York City, and grew up there. Her mother was Anna Ruth (née Blumenthal; 1907–1986), an elementary school teacher who gave up her teaching job to become a stay-at-home mother. Her father was Julius Yellen (1906–1975), a family physician who worked from the ground floor of their house. Janet has an older brother, John (born 1942), a program director for archaeology at the National Science Foundation.

In a speech at the POLIN Museum of the History of Polish Jews, Yellen said that her father's family immigrated to the United States from Sokołów Podlaski, a small town about 50 miles outside of Warsaw. She shared that nearly the entirety of its Jewish population, including many of her relatives, was deported or murdered during the Holocaust.

Yellen attended the local Fort Hamilton High School, where she was an honor society member and participated in the booster club, the psychology club, and the history club. She also served as editor-in-chief of The Pilot, the school newspaper, which continued its 13-year streak as the first-place winner of the prestigious Columbia Scholastic Press Association contest under her leadership. She earned a National Merit commendation letter and was admitted to a selective science honors program at Columbia University to voluntarily study mathematics on Saturday mornings. Yellen was one of 30 students to win state Regents scholarships for college and one of a select few to win the mayor's citation for a scholarship. She graduated in 1963 as the valedictorian of her class. In line with school tradition, for the editor to interview the valedictorian, she interviewed herself in the third person.

Yellen enrolled at Pembroke College in Brown University, initially intending to study philosophy. During her freshman year, she switched her planned major to economics and was particularly influenced by professors George Herbert Borts and Herschel Grossman. In the spring of 1964, she also joined the business staff of The Brown Daily Herald, but soon afterward left the paper to focus on her academic studies. Yellen graduated summa cum laude and Phi Beta Kappa with a bachelor's in economics from Brown University in 1967, and earned her master's and PhD in economics from Yale University in 1971. Her dissertation was titled Employment, Output and Capital Accumulation in an Open Economy: A Disequilibrium Approach under the supervision of James Tobin, a noted economist who would later receive the Nobel Memorial Prize. As a teaching assistant, Yellen was so meticulous in her note-taking during Tobin's macroeconomics class that her notes became the unofficial textbook and were referred to as "Yellen Notes" while being circulated among generations of graduate students. Her former professor and Nobel Prize in Economics laureate, Joseph Stiglitz, has called her one of his brightest and most memorable students. She later described Yale professors Tobin and William Brainard as "lifelong mentors" who laid the intellectual groundwork for her economic views. Yellen was the only woman among the two dozen economists who earned their doctorates from Yale in 1971.

Academic career 
After receiving her Ph.D., Yellen obtained the position of assistant professor of economics at Harvard University, where she taught from 1971 to 1976. At that time, she was one of only two women faculty in Harvard's economics department; the other woman was Rachel McCulloch. The pair struck up a close friendship and went on to write several academic papers together. In 1977, Yellen took a job within the Federal Reserve's Board of Governors after failing to win tenure at Harvard; she was recruited as a staff economist for the Board of Governors by Edwin M. Truman, who had known her from Yale. Truman was a junior professor when he heard Yellen's oral exam and was then about to take over the Fed's Division of International Finance. She was assigned to research international monetary reform.

While at the Fed, she met her husband, economist George Akerlof, in the bank's cafeteria; they married in 1978, less than a year later. By the time of their marriage, Akerlof had already accepted a teaching position at the London School of Economics (LSE). Yellen left her post at the Fed to accompany him and was given a tenure-track lectureship by LSE. The couple remained in the United Kingdom for two years, then returned to the United States.

In 1980, Yellen joined the faculty of the University of California, Berkeley, where she taught at the Haas School of Business to conduct macroeconomics research and teach undergraduate and MBA students for more than two decades. She earned the Haas School's outstanding teaching award twice, in 1985 and 1988. Prof. Yellen became just the second woman at Berkeley-Haas to earn tenure in 1982, as well as the title of full professor in 1985. She was named the Bernard T. Rocca, Jr. Professor of International Business and Trade in 1992.

From 1994 to 1999, Yellen took a leave of absence from Berkeley to go into public service. After returning to academia, she resumed her teaching assignment at Haas and received a joint appointment with Berkeley's Department of Economics. She was appointed the Eugene E. and Catherine M. Trefethen Professor of Business and Professor of Economics in 1999, and remained an active faculty member until she was appointed president & chief executive officer of the Federal Reserve Bank of San Francisco in 2004. Yellen was awarded the title of Professor Emeritus at UC Berkeley in 2006.
 
Throughout her career, Yellen served as an adviser to the Congressional Budget Office (CBO), the Brookings Panel on Economic Activity, and the National Science Foundation’s Panel in Economics. She was also a research associate at the National Bureau of Economic Research from 1999 to 2010.

Contributions to economics 
Yellen's academic career has largely focused on the analysis of the mechanisms of unemployment and labor markets, monetary and fiscal policies, and international trade. She has written a few widely cited papers, often collaborating on research with her husband, Professor George Akerlof.

Efficiency wage models 
Since the 1980s, Yellen and Akerlof have addressed what's known in the economics literature as "efficiency wage theory"the idea that paying people more than the market wage does increase their productivity. Their 1990 paper, entitled "The Fair-Wage Effort Hypothesis and Unemployment", coined "the fair wage effort hypothesis" and was considered by economists to be a significant contribution to the topic: "A precursor to the efficiency wage literature...it had an influence, although the work on efficiency wage theory has had a bigger influence." Akerlof and Yellen introduced the gift-exchange game, which argues that workers who are paid less than what they consider to be a fair wage will purposefully work less hard to exact revenge on their employer.

Reproductive technology shock 
Another work, "An Analysis of Out-of-Wedlock Childbearing in the United States", co-written with Akerlof and Michael Katz and published in 1996, aims to explain why out-of-wedlock births had grown considerably in previous decades in the United States. A research study led to a theory called "reproductive technology shock", arguing that the increased availability of both abortion and contraception in the late 1960s and early 1970s, amidst the sexual revolution, eroded the social norms surrounding sex, pregnancy, and marriage, leading to a sharp decline in the stigma of unwed motherhood. At the same time, this transformation encouraged biological fathers to reject notions of marital and paternal obligations.

Federal Reserve (1994–1997) 
On April 22, 1994, President Bill Clinton announced his intention to nominate Yellen as a member of the Federal Reserve Board of Governors, alongside Alan Blinder, who has been designated as vice chairman, the first Democratic appointee to the Board since 1980. In an issued statement, the president praised her as "one of the most prominent economists of her generation on the intersection of macroeconomics and labor markets." President Clinton played an indirect role in the selection process, delegating most of the responsibility to NEC Director Robert Rubin, Treasury Secretary Lloyd Bentsen, and CEA Chair Laura Tyson, who was a colleague of Yellen's at Berkeley. The group settled on her candidacy after an exhaustive search that at one point included nearly 50 names. In July, at her confirmation hearing before the Senate Banking Committee, Yellen said that Fed policies should keep the economy growing as much as possible without accelerating inflation but avoid taking a clear position on the prospect of further increases in interest rates. The Senate panel approved her nomination without much Republican opposition, by a vote of 18 to 1; the only dissenting vote came from Senator Lauch Faircloth (R-NC), who said that her concerns should be limited to inflation. The nomination was confirmed in the full United States Senate by a vote of 94–6. On August 12, 1994, Yellen was appointed to a full 14-year term and assumed the seat vacated by Republican Wayne Angell. Her appointment as the fourth female governor, alongside previously installed Susan M. Phillips, marks the first time two women have served simultaneously on the Federal Reserve Board.

In July 1996, the Federal Reserve resisted pressure to raise interest rates as unemployment dropped. Yellen marshaled academic research to dissuade Chairman Alan Greenspan from committing the Fed to a zero inflation policy and demonstrate that the central bank should seek to moderate inflation rather than eliminate it. According to the study, a low inflation rate of around 2 percent provided a better foundation for reducing unemployment and increasing economic growth than the goal of zero.

Upon her confirmation as chair of the Council of Economic Advisers, she resigned as a member of the Board of Governors of the Federal Reserve System on February 17, 1997.

Council of Economic Advisers (1997–1999) 

On December 20, 1996, Yellen joined the Clinton administration as chair of President Clinton's Council of Economic Advisers (CEA), replacing Joseph Stiglitz in office. She was reluctant to leave the Federal Reserve, but the White House officials passed over others with greater marquee value and talked her into the job because, as Treasury Secretary Robert Rubin
said, "we wanted someone who could bring a rigorous analytic approach to the issues and who could work well with others." Yellen was unanimously confirmed by the Senate on February 13, 1997, thereby becoming the second woman to serve as chief economic advisor to the president after Laura Tyson. While serving within the Administration, she concurrently chaired the OECD Economic Policy Committee from 1997 to 1999.

During her time with the Council of Economic Advisers, Yellen oversaw a June 1998 report, "Explaining Trends in the Gender Wage Gap", which focused on the gender pay divide. Within this study, the Council analyzed data from 1969 to 1996 to determine the reasons why women earn substantially less than men. By observing trends attributable to issues such as occupation and industry, as well as familial status, it was determined that while the Equal Pay Act of 1963 was a step forward, there was no explanation for a 25 percent difference between average pay for women and men – an improvement from the 40 percent gap two decades earlier. It was concluded that this gap had no correlation with differences in productivity and, as such, was the result of discrimination within the workforce.

In June 1999, Yellen announced that she was stepping down from the CEA for personal reasons and would return to teaching at UC Berkeley. It was reported that President Clinton asked her to take over from Alice Rivlin, the central bank's vice chairwoman – an offer she turned down.

Return to the Federal Reserve (2004–2018)

Federal Reserve Bank of San Francisco 
On April 12, 2004, the Federal Reserve announced that Yellen would replace Robert T. Parry as president and chief executive officer of the Federal Reserve Bank of San Francisco, taking office on June 14. She became the first woman to hold this position. While serving as district FRB president, she sat on the policy-setting Federal Open Market Committee (FOMC) and was a voting member once every three years on a rotating basis, with her first being in 2006. During her time at the San Francisco Fed, the largest of the 12 Federal Reserve Banks in terms of population and economic output, Yellen publicly downplayed concerns about the potential consequences of the boom in housing prices; at FOMC meetings, on the contrary, she sounded the alarm on banks' heavy concentration in risky construction and home-development loans. On the other hand, she did not lead the San Francisco Fed to "move to check [the] increasingly indiscriminate lending" of Countrywide Financial, the country's largest lender. On June 5, 2009, Yellen said that the Federal Reserve should consider raising interest rates earlier to prevent another housing bubble. She argued that higher short-term interest rates probably went against the expansion of a bubble in certain circumstances, like restraining the demand for housing and high-risk mortgages.

In July 2009, Yellen was mentioned as a potential successor to Chairman Ben Bernanke when his term was set to expire before he was re-nominated for a second four-year term. She eventually emerged as the leading contender for vice chair of the Federal Reserve Board in March 2010, and following her Senate confirmation, she resigned from the San Francisco Fed in October of that year.

Vice Chair of the Federal Reserve 

On April 28, 2010, President Barack Obama nominated Yellen to succeed Donald Kohn as vice chair of the Federal Reserve. In July, the Senate Banking Committee voted 17–6 to confirm her, though the top Republican on the panel, Sen. Richard Shelby of Alabama, voted no, saying he believed Yellen had an "inflationary bias." At the same time, on the heels of related testimony by Fed chairman Bernanke, FOMC voting member James B. Bullard of the St. Louis Fed stated that the U.S. economy was at risk of becoming "enmeshed in a Japanese-style deflationary outcome within the next several years."

Bullard's statement was interpreted as a possible shift within the FOMC balance between inflation hawks and doves. Yellen's pending confirmation, along with those of Peter Diamond and Sarah Bloom Raskin to fill vacancies, was seen as possibly furthering such a shift in the FOMC. All three nominations were seen as "on track to be confirmed by the Senate."

On September 29, 2010, Yellen, alongside Raskin, was confirmed by the Senate on a voice vote to be both a member of the board of governors and vice chairman of the Federal Reserve System. On October 4, the pair were sworn in as Fed governors, while Yellen also took the oath of office as vice chair of the board for a four-year term. Simultaneously, she began a 14-year term as a member of the Federal Reserve Board, filling a vacant seat last held by Mark W. Olson. Yellen was just the second woman to hold the Federal Reserve's No.2 post, after Alice Rivlin.

Yellen, as vice chair, by contrast with her predecessors, has acted more as an independent force within the institution. She has been trying to persuade Bernanke and the rest of the committee to adopt her preferred course for monetary policy, advocating more aggressive steps to pump money into the economy to bring down unemployment. Yellen played a leading role in moving the Federal Reserve to announce its inflation target of two percent a year, after her long campaign with Chairman Bernanke; she was an early supporter of inflation targeting facing opposition from Chairman Greenspan during her first stint at the Fed in the 1990s.

Yellen was considered the front-runner to succeed Bernanke as the Federal Reserve's chair when his second term ceased. The other leading candidate for the position in what turned out to be a high-profile race was Lawrence Summers, a former treasury secretary under President Clinton and former director of President Obama's National Economic Council; it was reported that the president was leaning toward picking the latter of two. However, throughout the race, Summers drew criticism from both sides of the aisle for his role in deregulating parts of the banking sector while he served in the Clinton administration. He sparked further controversy for remarks on women's aptitude in math and science, which he made in 2005 while serving as Harvard University's president. In July 2013, Yellen was pushed to be named the first chairwoman of the central bank in a letter that was circulated among the Senate Democrats and had been signed by almost a third of the 54 caucus senators, who primarily represent the liberal wing of the party. In addition, more than 500 professional economists from around 200 colleges and universities across the United States signed an open letter in support of her candidacy for Fed chair and sent it to the White House. After weeks of opposition to his potential nomination, Summers withdrew his name from consideration for the position in September.

Chair of the Federal Reserve 

On October 9, 2013, Yellen was officially nominated to replace Bernanke as chair of the Federal Reserve, the first vice chair ever to be elevated to that post. While announcing his decision, President Obama called her "one of the nation's foremost economists and policymakers" and said that "America’s workers and their families will have a champion in Janet Yellen." During the nomination hearings held on November 14, Yellen defended the more than $3 trillion in stimulus funds that the central bank had been injecting into the U.S. economy. She also said that it is important for the Fed to try to detect asset bubbles and that if she saw one, she would work to address it.

On December 20, 2013, the U.S. Senate voted 59–34 for cloture on Yellen's nomination. On January 6, 2014, she was confirmed as chair of the Federal Reserve by a vote of 56–26, the narrowest margin ever for the position. Yellen was a trailblazer as the first woman to head the U.S. central bank, or any major central bank, and the first Democrat to do so since Paul Volcker assumed that position in 1979 via President Jimmy Carter. She was sworn into office on February 3, 2014, and was previously elected as FOMC chair on January 30. According to a Fed representative, on Yellen's request, her title would be altered to "chair" rather than "chairman" or "chairwoman," as she prefers a gender-neutral manner. Only one woman ever led the central bank of a G8 country before YellenRussia's Elvira Nabiullina.

In July 2014, at her first semi-annual congressional testimony on U S. monetary policy, Yellen said, "while real estate, equities, and corporate bond prices have risen appreciably and valuation metrics have increased they were generally in line with historical norms." She also acknowledged some concerns about the valuations of lower-rated corporate debt and affirmed that she and other Fed officials were monitoring trends but did not believe that a so-called "everything bubble" was forming.

On December 16, 2015, the Federal Reserve under Yellen increased its key interest rate for the first time since 2006. That move was largely expected because extraordinarily low rates for an extremely long time may contribute to financial instability and pose a threat to the economy and was considered a departure from the previous controversial Fed policy, commonly known as the Greenspan put. During her tenure, the Fed has gradually raised rates four additional times, leaving its key rate in a still-low range of 1.25 percent to 1.5 percentwell below historical standards.

After the 2016 presidential election, Yellen gave a strong defense of the Dodd–Frank Act at her Joint Economic Committee testimony, standing in opposition to the incoming President Donald Trump's plans to review the landmark legislation. She argued that it would be inappropriate to weaken or repeal the law designed to prevent a repeat of the 2008 financial crisis.

In November 2017, as Yellen's tenure as chair of the Federal Reserve was coming to an end, Trump considered nominating her for another term, but on the advice of his Treasury Secretary Steven Mnuchin, picked a Republican Fed governor, Jerome Powell, instead. Yellen made her resignation from the Federal Reserve Board at the conclusion of her chairmanship known after Trump's choice, despite still having her assignment as Fed governor until 2024. She served a single term and became just the second Federal Reserve chair eligible for reappointment not renominated by a successor presidential administration, the first being Arthur F. Burns almost 40 years prior. That unusual departure makes her the briefest-serving central bank chief since G. William Miller, who held that office for over a year, from 1978 to 1979.

On February 2, 2018, her last day in office, Yellen enforced unprecedented sanctions on Wells Fargo, the third-largest U.S. bank at the time, with a consent order that restricted the firm from future growth until the organization fixed its internal problems. The move came in response to a string of "widespread consumer abuses and compliance breakdowns" at the company, including a fake account scandal, and marked the first time the Federal Reserve has imposed a cap on the entire assets of a financial institution.

Regarding labor markets, Yellen has been dubbed one of the Federal Reserve System's most successful chairpersons. During her term, the unemployment rate dropped from 6.7 percent to 4.1 percent, the lowest in 17 years. For the first time since central bank creation, the economy had added jobs throughout every month of any Fed chair's tenure. Yellen completed her time at the Fed with the lowest final unemployment rate of any Fed chair since William McChesney Martin in 1970. Under her leadership, the U.S. unemployment rate fell more than during any other chair's term in the post-World War II era, declining 2.6 percentage points. On the other hand, inflation remained below the Fed's annual two percent target, which led to the suggestion that the Federal Reserve could have done even more to bolster the economy without the risk of price increases.

Yellen holds a unique place in Federal Reserve System history. In addition to being the first woman to lead the institution, she was also the first person ever to have served in the nation's central bank system, with stints as the Federal Reserve chair (from 2014 to 2018), vice chair (from 2010 to 2014), FRB regional president (at the San Francisco Fed, from 2004 to 2010), Fed governor (from 1994 to 1997), and Fed staff economist (from 1977 to 1978).

After the Federal Reserve (2018–2020) 

On February 2, 2018, the Brookings Institution announced that Yellen would join the think tank as a distinguished fellow in residence with the Economic Studies program, effective February 5, 2018. She's been affiliated with the Hutchins Center on Fiscal and Monetary Policy at Brookings. On July 31, 2018, the Hutchins Center announced Yellen, James H. Stock, and Louise Sheiner as co-chairs of the newly launched Productivity Measurement Initiative, aimed at improving the quality of economic statistics.

In November 2020, Yellen left her position at Brookings after being selected as a nominee to serve as Treasury secretary. Within the think tank, she has been providing expertise and commentary on a range of economic issues, offering her perspective and analysis at Brookings panels, congressional testimony, lectures across the United States and abroad, and regularly serving as a commentator in the media.

On June 27, 2017, Yellen stated that she did not expect another financial crisis "in our lifetime" because she thought banks were "much stronger" as a result of Federal Reserve oversight. In a December 10, 2018 conversation with Paul Krugman at the City University of New York, she warned of the possibility of another financial crisis by citing "gigantic holes in the system" after she departs from the Federal Reserve.

On February 25, 2019, in an interview with Marketplace, when asked if she believed Trump has "a grasp of macroeconomic policy," Yellen replied, "No, I do not." She expressed her doubts about the president's ability to articulate the Federal Reserve's explicit goals of "maximum employment and price stability" and emphasized his assertions that the Federal Reserve's goals include trade, which she explains are objectively false. She raised further concern over Trump's regard for the independence of the central bank  and voiced support for her successor, Jerome Powell. This interview marked a notable change in tone for Yellen, who traditionally handled her differences with the president in a neutral manner. 

On July 17, 2020, at the hearing of the United States House Select Oversight Subcommittee on the Coronavirus Crisis, which was set up by the House Committee on Oversight and Reform, former Federal Reserve chairs Bernanke and Yellen testified about the economic policy response to the negative impact of the coronavirus pandemic. They urged lawmakers to act aggressively with fiscal stimulus in three areas: extending the supplementary unemployment payments; providing additional financial assistance to hard-hit states and local governments; and investing in the medical response to the pandemic. She also expressed this commitment to stimulus in an op-ed for The New York Times with Jared Bernstein, a senior fellow at the Center on Budget and Policy Priorities.

In August 2020, it was reported that Yellen was among a handful of economists who briefed former vice president Joe Biden, the presumptive Democratic nominee for president, and his chosen running mate, Sen. Kamala Harris, on economic issues. The meeting was one of the first times the Biden campaign announced its economic expert, whom few at the time predicted would take a presidential cabinet post.
 
Between 2018 and 2020, Yellen received over $7million in speaking fees from financial companies such as Barclays, Citigroup, Goldman Sachs, and the hedge fund Citadel after leaving the Federal Reserve. With her return to government, she pledged to get official permission from the Office of Government Ethics (OGE) to participate in substantive issues involving such firms to avoid any conflict of interest.

Secretary of the Treasury (2021–present)

Nomination and confirmation

Following the 2020 presidential election, Yellen was routinely mentioned as a possible secretary of the treasury in the incoming Biden administration. She edged out other top contenders to obtain the position, including Fed Board Gov. Lael Brainard and Roger W. Ferguson Jr., a former vice chairman at the central bank.

On November 30, 2020, then-President-elect Biden announced he would nominate Yellen as Treasury Secretary in his Cabinet. In his remarks on the announcement, Biden lauded her as "one of the most important economic thinkers of our time" who "spent her career focused on employment and the dignity of work." Despite being a highly respected figure across the political spectrum and expected to win confirmation easily, she was considered an unusual pick for the position because of her lack of experience in political maneuvering. Unlike her predecessors, she is viewed as more of an academic economist than a traditional politician used to horse-trading and dealmaking, qualities that could be critical to  achieving the goals of Biden's economic agenda in a deeply partisan Congress. All living former U.S. treasury secretaries, from George Shultz to Jack Lew, endorsed Yellen for the position in a bipartisan letter calling on the Senate to swiftly confirm her.

The Senate Finance Committee unanimously approved Yellen's candidacy by a 26–0 vote on January 22, 2021. The full U.S. Senate confirmed her nomination with a vote of 84–15 (with one abstention, Marco Rubio, R-FL) on January 25. With her oath of office administered by Vice President Harris the next day, Yellen became the first female Secretary of the Treasury and the first person in American history to lead the three most powerful economic bodies in the federal government of the United States: the Treasury Department, the Federal Reserve, and the White House Council of Economic Advisers.

Only two other women within the G7 nationsFrance's Christine Lagarde and Canada's Chrystia Freelandhave held positions analogous to Yellen's as Treasury Secretary.

Tenure

Proposed international tax reform

In April 2021, Yellen proposed a global minimum corporate tax rate to prevent profit shifting used by multinational companies for purposes of tax avoidance; she outlined in a written op-ed for The Wall Street Journal the impending tax system's tremendous benefits for the United States and the world economy. Finance ministers from the Group of Seven (G7) reached a historic agreement to reform the global tax system on June 5, 2021, agreeing to reinstate a minimum global corporate tax rate of at least 15%; French finance minister Bruno Le Maire called it "a starting point" that could be increased in the future.  A few days later, Treasury Secretary Yellen joined with four foreign counterparts in penning an op-ed for The Washington Post that described the new accord as "a historic opportunity to end the race to the bottom in corporate taxation, restoring government resources at a time when they are most needed." A new framework for international tax reform was endorsed the following month as a result of U.S.-backed negotiations within the Organization for Economic Cooperation and Development (OECD) to achieve greater global tax parity among the group of 130 nations, which account for more than 90 percent of global GDP. On July 10, financial leaders from the G20 countries came to an agreement on plans to put an end to global tax havens, force multinational corporations to pay an appropriate share of tax wherever they operate, and create a "more stable and fair international tax architecture."

In October 2021, more than 130 countries, including several low-tax jurisdictions that had resisted the pact, enforced through the OECD a landmark agreement to set a global minimum tax rate of 15% starting in 2023 for companies around the world. It said the deal could bring in an extra $150billion in annual tax revenues. Implementation requires ratification by a two-thirds majority in the evenly divided U.S. Senate, as well as passing domestic legislation in each of the signed countries.

Debt ceiling crisis
On July 23, 2021, Yellen sent a letter to House Speaker Nancy Pelosi and other congressional leaders, in which she urged lawmakers to increase or suspend the nation's debt limit as soon as possible before it hit its statutory limit in August and the government would be unable to pay its bills. She warned Congress that failing to meet those obligations would cause "irreparable harm" to the U.S. economy and that the Treasury Department would take “extraordinary measures” to prevent the United States from suffering government shutdown or even a debt default.

On September 19, 2021, Yellen, in an op-ed for The Wall Street Journal, again called for an increase in the debt ceiling; otherwise, sometime in October, Treasury would exhaust its cash reserves, which would trigger a financial crisis. After Congress adopted a short-term debt-ceiling bill to raise the country's borrowing into early December, Yellen said that lawmakers needed to act with responsibility and provide longer-term certainty for government solvency. In November, Yellen expressed her willingness to consider solutions to the debt crisis without GOP support if necessary, using a budget reconciliation procedure as a viable alternative.

In December 2021, President Biden signed a debt ceiling increase into law, preventing a U.S. default, a day after the Treasury's previously estimated deadline to address the issue. Congressional legislation expected to allow the government to cover its financial obligations beyond the 2022 midterm elections was passed in a nearly party-line vote.

Sanctions against Russia and oil price cap
In November 2021, Yellen and senior Treasury personnel were tasked with developing a sanctions strategy that would maximize the costs inflicted on Russia’s economy while minimizing the impact felt by the United States and ally countries should a potential aggression begin. In February 2022, a multilateral coalition imposed massive and unprecedented sanctions against Russia, largely crafted by the Treasury Department in close consultation with partners in response to the invasion of Ukraine.

Yellen was a key proponent of a price cap on Russian oil, a plan designed to deprive the Kremlin of funding for its war in Ukraine while at the same time intending to reduce an inflation surge by preserving the global oil supply. After months of lobbying and negotiations by the United States, on December 2, 2022, the alliance consisting of the G7 nations, the European Union, and Australia agreed to cap the price of Russian oil at $60 per barrel as an upper limit, with regular reviews to check that the ceiling stays at least 5 percent below average market prices.

Digital Assets Regulation
On April 7, 2022, at American University's Kogod School of Business Center for Innovation, Yellen addressed for the first time the growing impact of digital assets on the American economy. Yellen outlined policy objectives and lessons that apply to the navigation of emerging technologies, which include "first, the U.S. financial system benefits from responsible innovation; second, it's often society's vulnerable who suffer most in an economic crisis when regulation is not moving at the same pace as innovation; third, regulation should focus on activities and risk, not technology; fourth, sovereign money is the core of a functioning financial system; and fifth, it'll take thoughtful public and private dialogue between various groups to move forward."

Yellen also announced possible plans for a government version of a stablecoin; the administration is studying the possibility of issuing a central bank digital currency (CBDC) or digital dollar while taking into consideration the impact of a CBDC on monetary policy, national security, and international trade, as well as its utility for consumers. Solving such problems is an "engineering challenge that would require years of development, not months," she said.

Friendshoring of supply chains
In a speech delivered at the Atlantic Council on April 13, 2022, Yellen warned against the supply chain risks posed by reliance on supplies from countries that align with the authoritarian regimes of Russia or China and favored friendshoring, an approach that limits supply chain networks to allies and friendly countries.

In December 2022, Yellen wrote an essay for Project Syndicate, where she singled out the main risks for the U.S. economy that should be solved with the implementation of friendshoring. Those risks include: "first, over-concentration of critical goods in any particular market may result in vulnerability in supply chains that hurt workers and customers; second, the need to protect from geopolitical and security risks emanating from hostile states; and third, the need to shift away from supply chains that relied on violations of core human rights, such as the use of forced labour to produce goods for import."

Comments on Roe v. Wade overturning
On May 10, 2022, during a Senate Banking Committee hearing, Yellen made comments on the economic consequences of Roe v. Wade overturning after a leaked draft majority opinion in Dobbs v. Jackson Women's Health Organization showed the Supreme Court was poised to overrule its previous decisions that legalized abortion in the United States. Sen. Bob Menendez (D-NJ) asked what reversing the landmark ruling would mean economically for the country; Yellen responded, "I believe that eliminating the right of women to make decisions about when and whether to have children would have very damaging effects on the economy and would set women back decades." She added that keeping women from accessing abortions "increases their odds of living in poverty or need for public assistance." Sen. Tim Scott (R-SC) called Yellen's stance "harsh." She replied, "This is not harsh. This is the truth."

Following their heated exchange, Senator Scott penned an op-ed for The Washington Post, in which he called Yellen's claim "simply false" and compared her arguments to those of Margaret Sanger in support of eugenics.

Internal Revenue Service reforms 
After the passage of the Inflation Reduction Act, Yellen directed the Internal Revenue Service (IRS) to use $80 billion in additional IRS funding to clear backlogs, improve taxpayer services, update technology, and hire thousands of new employees.

Visit to Ukraine
On February 27, 2023, Yellen made a surprise visit to Kyiv, in which she reaffirmed ongoing U.S. economic support for Ukraine in its struggle against Russia's invasion, including nearly $50 billion in security, financial, and humanitarian aid the federal government has provided over the past year as Ukraine's largest bilateral donor. She met with Ukrainian president Volodymyr Zelenskyy and the country's prime minister, Denys Shmyhal, to discuss the rollout of about $1.25 billion in budget relief, the first of a $10 billion package of civilian assistance for things like schools, hospitals, and emergency services, among others. Coinciding with her visit, Yellen wrote an op-ed for The New York Times in which she repeated President Biden’s message that Washington will stand with the Ukrainian people for as long as it takes and said, "We cannot allow Ukraine to lose the war for economic reasons when it has shown an ability to succeed on the battlefield."

Banking crisis

In March 2023, amidst the ongoing bank crisis, Yellen made an appearance on CBS' Face the Nation to declare that financial regulators closely monitored the state of the banking system to make sure it remained safe and well-capitalized. Addressing the collapse of Silicon Valley Bank, which marked the second-largest bank failure in American history, she said the federal government is "concerned about depositors and are focused on trying to meet their needs." However, she ruled out the possibility of a bailout.

Economic philosophy 
Yellen is widely considered to be a "dove" on monetary policy (i.e., more concerned with unemployment than with inflation) and, as such, generally favors lower rather than higher Federal Reserve interest rates. She was arguably the most liberal Federal Reserve leader since Marriner S. Eccles, who was appointed by President Franklin D. Roosevelt amidst the Great Depression in 1934. On fiscal policy, publications frequently refer to her as "sort of" a deficit hawk. She expressed concern about the United States fiscal path prior to the COVID-19 recession, particularly about the national debt; in 2018, she said, "If I had a magic wand, I would raise taxes and cut retirement spending." The following year, she again suggested that she favored both raising revenue and making changes to the Medicare, Medicaid, and Social Security programs to control spending. In September 2021, at a House Financial Services Committee hearing, Yellen lent support to efforts for the complete removal of the debt ceiling, arguing that the borrowing cap is "very destructive" and poses an unnecessary threat to the American economy.

She has supported tighter financial regulation to reduce systemic risks arising from vulnerabilities in the financial system. In October 2020, the Group of Thirty's Steering Committee Working Group on Climate Change and Finance, which Yellen co-chaired with Mark Carney, prepared a report that developed a robust and inclusive strategy to amplify and mainstream the global transition to a net zero emissions economy. The study calls upon governments, businesses, and financial institutions to assess climate risks and supports a phase-in of carbon pricing to accelerate a shift to carbon neutrality.

Yellen is a Keynesian economist and has been described as a "Keynesian to her fingertips." During the Great Recession, she "warned against an over-hasty removal of stimulus," "insisted that the Fed pay as much attention to unemployment as to inflation," and "believes the state has a duty to tackle poverty and inequality." In a speech delivered to the Yale economics department reunion in April 1999, Yellen discussed her views on the application of Keynesian economics to policymaking. She stated that while most economists "appreciate the value of markets and incentives," Yalies "can recognize when they are not operating correctly and have higher concern for policies to remedy them." When her appointment as treasury secretary was announced in December 2020, Yellen was viewed by Wall Street as "a Treasury secretary who will push hard for expansionary policies aimed at boosting growth, profits and share prices," although the ability of Yellen to push through her preferred fiscal policies was seen as likely to be constrained by congressional gridlock.

Honors and awards 
Yellen has received numerous honors in recognition of her career in academia and politics. These include:

Scholastic

Memberships and fellowships

Awards

Other recognition 
 In March 2018, Charles D. Ellis endowed The Janet L. Yellen Chair at the Yale School of Management, which was named after her. Professor Andrew Metrick has been invested as the inaugural Janet L. Yellen Professor of Finance and Management at the School.
 In December 2018, Federal Reserve Board presented an annual Janet L. Yellen Award for Excellence in Community Development to recognize the exemplary work of Federal Reserve System staff, intended to honor former chair Yellen's commitment to public service. Ariel Cisneros of the Federal Reserve Bank of Kansas City has been named the first recipient of the newly created award.

Personal life 
Yellen is married to George Akerlof, an economist who is a university professor at the McCourt School of Public Policy at Georgetown University and Koshland Professor of Economics Emeritus at the University of California, Berkeley, as well as 2001 Nobel Memorial Prize in Economic Sciences laureate. Yellen and Akerlof first crossed paths at the Fed in the fall of 1977 and wedded in June 1978, less than a year after meeting. Their son Robert Akerlof, was born in 1981 and is also an economist. He graduated with a bachelor of arts summa cum laude with special distinction in economics and mathematics from Yale University in 2003, and received a Ph.D. in economics from Harvard University in 2009, where he was a presidential scholar. Robert is an associate professor of economics at the University of Warwick. 

Yellen and Akerlof have often collaborated on research, including topics such as poverty, unemployment and a paper on the costs of out-of-wedlock childbearing. One of their most discussed papers at Berkeley, on why lower wages sometimes lead to lower employment, came from the personal experience of hiring a nanny for the first time. Yellen says Akerlof has been her biggest intellectual influence. Both frequently state that their lone disagreement is that she is a bit more supportive of free trade than he is.

Yellen has an estimated net worth of $20million, accrued from stock holdings, speaking engagements, and various government and academic positions.  In February 2021, she divested holdings in corporations including Pfizer, ConocoPhillips and AT&T, among others, when she assumed the public office of U.S. Treasury Secretary.

Yellen inherited from her mother a valuable collection of postage stamps worth between $15,000 and $50,000. Despite this, she doesn’t collect them on her own.

In popular culture 
"Who's Yellen Now?" is a song by musician Dessa, commissioned by Marketplace, following the joking suggestion by then-President-elect Biden that Lin-Manuel Miranda should write a Hamiltonesque musical about Yellen, reflecting the historic nature of her nomination as nation's first female treasury secretary, on December 1, 2020.

On NBC's sketch comedy show Saturday Night Live, Yellen has been parodied by actress Kate McKinnon since 2021.

Selected works

Books

Articles

See also 
 List of female United States Cabinet members
 List of people who have held multiple United States Cabinet-level positions

References

External links

Official 
 Biography at the United States Department of the Treasury
 Biography at the Federal Reserve
 Clinton White House biography (archived)
 Expert profile at the Brookings Institution
 Faculty profile at the Haas School of Business
 Faculty profile at University of California, Berkeley

Other 
 
 Profile and papers at Research Papers in Economics
 

1946 births
Living people
20th-century American economists
20th-century American women
21st-century American economists
21st-century American women
Academics of the London School of Economics
American expatriate academics
American people of Polish-Jewish descent
American women economists
Biden administration cabinet members
Brookings Institution people
California Democrats
Chairs of the Federal Reserve
Chairs of the United States Council of Economic Advisers
Clinton administration cabinet members
Distinguished Fellows of the American Economic Association
Economists from California
Economists from New York (state)
Expatriate academics in the United Kingdom
Federal Reserve Bank of San Francisco presidents
Federal Reserve economists
Fellows of the American Academy of Arts and Sciences
Fellows of the Econometric Society
Female finance ministers
Fort Hamilton High School alumni
Group of Thirty
Haas School of Business faculty
Harvard University faculty
Honorary Fellows of the British Academy
Jewish American economists
Jewish American members of the Cabinet of the United States
Labor economists
Macroeconomists
Massachusetts Institute of Technology fellows
Monetary economists
National Bureau of Economic Research
New Keynesian economists
New York (state) Democrats
Obama administration personnel
Pembroke College in Brown University alumni
People from Bay Ridge, Brooklyn
Presidents of the American Economic Association
Trump administration personnel
United States Secretaries of the Treasury
University of California, Berkeley faculty
Vice Chairs of the Federal Reserve
Women members of the Cabinet of the United States
Yale Graduate School of Arts and Sciences alumni
Yale University fellows
Biden administration personnel